The Green Man was a public house at 1308 High Road, Whetstone, north London, that dated from the 15th century and subsequently redeveloped several times. It closed in the late 20th century and is now a motor repair business.

History
An inn belonged to the Heybourne family is thought to have existed on the site as early as 1400. It was known as The Lion when it was sold by John Doggett to Thomas Copewood in 1485. It may later have been known as The Red Lion. It subsequently became The Green Man.

The pub was located on the High Road, originally part of the Great North Road, the principal route north out of London to Scotland since medieval times, and popular with drovers. At one time it had a large pond and eight acres of grazing at the rear. The pub was closed by 1980 and is now a motor repair business.

The building
The pub was rebuilt in 1740 and refronted in 1830. The current building, which at the front is the pub's former stables, dates from 1890 when it was again rebuilt.

References

External links

Whetstone, London
Pubs in the London Borough of Barnet
Former pubs in London